NESSIE (New European Schemes for Signatures, Integrity and Encryption) was a European research project funded from 2000 to 2003 to identify secure cryptographic primitives. The project was comparable to the NIST AES process and the Japanese Government-sponsored CRYPTREC project, but with notable differences from both. In particular, there is both overlap and disagreement between the selections and recommendations from NESSIE and CRYPTREC (as of the August 2003 draft report). The NESSIE participants include some of the foremost active cryptographers in the world, as does the CRYPTREC project.

NESSIE was intended to identify and evaluate quality cryptographic designs in several categories, and to that end issued a public call for submissions in March 2000. Forty-two were received, and in February 2003 twelve of the submissions were selected. In addition, five algorithms already publicly known, but not explicitly submitted to the project, were chosen as "selectees". The project has publicly announced that "no weaknesses were found in the selected designs".

Selected algorithms
The selected algorithms and their submitters or developers are listed below. The five already publicly known, but not formally submitted to the project, are marked with a "*". Most may be used by anyone for any purpose without needing to seek a patent license from anyone; a license agreement is needed for those marked with a "#", but the licensors of those have committed to "reasonable non-discriminatory license terms for all interested", according to a NESSIE project press release.

None of the six stream ciphers submitted to NESSIE were selected because every one fell to cryptanalysis.  This surprising result led to the eSTREAM project.

Block ciphers
MISTY1: Mitsubishi Electric
AES*: (Advanced Encryption Standard) (NIST, FIPS Pub 197) (aka Rijndael)
Camellia: Nippon Telegraph and Telephone and Mitsubishi Electric
SHACAL-2: Gemplus

Collision-Resistant Hash Functions
WHIRLPOOL: Scopus Tecnologia S.A. and K.U.Leuven
SHA-256*, SHA-384* and SHA-512*: NSA, (US FIPS 180-2)

Message Authentication Codes
UMAC: Intel Corp, Univ. of Nevada at Reno, IBM Research Laboratory, Technion Institute, and Univ. of California at Davis
Two-Track-MAC: Katholieke Universiteit Leuven and debis AG
EMAC: Berendschot et al.
HMAC*: (ISO/IEC 9797-1);

Asymmetric encryption schemes
PSEC-KEM: Nippon Telegraph and Telephone Corp
RSA-KEM*: RSA key exchange mechanism (draft of ISO/IEC 18033-2)
ACE Encrypt#: IBM Zurich Research Laboratory

Digital signature algorithms
RSA-PSS: RSA Laboratories
ECDSA: Certicom Corp
SFLASH: Schlumberger Corp (SFLASH was broken in 2007 and should not be used anymore).

Asymmetric Identification Schemes
GPS-auth: Ecole Normale Supérieure, France Télécom, and La Poste

Other entrants

Entrants that did not get past the first stage of the contest include Noekeon, Q, Nimbus, NUSH, Grand Cru, Anubis, Hierocrypt, SC2000, and LILI-128.

Project contractors
The contractors and their representatives in the project were:

 Katholieke Universiteit Leuven (Prime contractor): Bart Preneel, Alex Biryukov, Antoon Bosselaers, Christophe de Cannière, Bart Van Rompay
 École Normale Supérieure: Jacques Stern, Louis Granboulan, Gwenaëlle Martinet
 Royal Holloway, University of London: Sean Murphy, Alex Dent, Rachel Shipsey, Christine Swart, Juliette White
 Siemens AG: Markus Dichtl, Marcus Schafheutle
 Technion Institute of Technology: Eli Biham, Orr Dunkelman, Vladimir Furman
 Université catholique de Louvain: Jean-Jacques Quisquater, Mathieu Ciet, Francesco Sica
 Universitetet i Bergen: Lars Knudsen, Håvard Raddum

See also
 ECRYPT

References

External links
 The homepage of the NESSIE project

Cryptography contests
Cryptography standards
Research projects